Niina Koskela (born 8 August 1971), married from 2004 to 2009 as Niina Sammalvuo, is a Finnish chess player. In 2006, she was the first Finnish woman to receive the FIDE title of Woman Grandmaster (WGM). She is a three-time winner of the Finnish Women's Chess Championship (1990, 2002, 2008). Since 2012, she has played for Norway.

Biography
Koskela is participant in numerous Finnish Women's Chess Championships, where winning three gold medals (1990, 2002, 2008) and three silver medals (1989, 1992, 1994). In 1991, in Subotica, Niina Koskela participated in Women's World Chess Championship Interzonal Tournament and ranked in 34th place. In 2000, Niina Koskela participated in Women's World Chess Championship by knock-out system and in the first round won to Subbaraman Vijayalakshmi but in the second round lost to Nana Ioseliani.

She played for Finland and Norway in the Women's Chess Olympiads:
 In 1990, at second board in the 29th Chess Olympiad (women) in Novi Sad (+4, =4, -5),
 In 1992, at second board in the 30th Chess Olympiad (women) in Manila (+5, =5, -4),
 In 1998, at second board in the 33rd Chess Olympiad (women) in Elista (+7, =4, -1) and won individual bronze medal,
 In 2002, at first board in the 35th Chess Olympiad (women) in Bled (+6, =6, -2),
 In 2004, at first board in the 36th Chess Olympiad (women) in Calvià (+6, =6, -2),
 In 2006, at first board in the 37th Chess Olympiad (women) in Turin (+6, =6, -0),
 In 2008, at first board in the 38th Chess Olympiad (women) in Dresden (+4, =2, -3),
 In 2014, at fourth board in the 41st Chess Olympiad (women) in Tromsø (+5, =4, -0).

Koskela played for Finland and Norway in the European Team Chess Championships:
 In 1992, at second board in the 1st European Team Chess Championship (women) in Debrecen (+5, =3, -1) and won individual silver medal,
 In 1999, at first board in the 3rd European Team Chess Championship (women) in Batumi (+1, =3, -4),
 In 2003, at first board in the 5th European Team Chess Championship (women) in Plovdiv (+3, =2, -3),
 In 2007, at first board in the 7th European Team Chess Championship (women) in Heraklion (+1, =1, -2),
 In 2015, at second board in the 11th European Team Chess Championship (women) in Reykjavik (+3, =4, -1).

References

External links
 
 
 

1971 births
Living people
Finnish chess players
Norwegian female chess players
Chess woman grandmasters
Chess Olympiad competitors
Finnish expatriate sportspeople in Norway
Norwegian people of Finnish descent